Ahabarsu is a community in the Upper Manya Krobo District in the Eastern Region of Ghana.

References 

Eastern Region (Ghana)
Communities in Ghana